Pir-e Sabz (also Romanized as Pīr-e Sabz and Pīr Sabz) is a village in Somghan Rural District, Chenar Shahijan District, Kazerun County, Fars Province, Iran. At the 2006 census, its population was 563, in 125 families.

References 

Populated places in Chenar Shahijan County